The First Flower is Play Dead's debut album, recorded at the Jungle Records studio in March 1983. Originally titled The First Flower: A Six Track Album, this album came totally unexpected as the group had disappeared since their last record company Fresh Records had gone under. The album was reissued in 1993 as simply "The First Flower" and included ten extra tracks. Four of the ten extra tracks featured original guitarist "Re-Vox."

Track listing
All songs written by Play Dead.

"Time" – 4:06
"The Tenant" – 5:37
"Propaganda" – 3:10
"Sin of Sins" – 5:27
"In Silence" – 3:46
"Don't Leave Without Me" – 4:22
"Shine" – 3:39
"Gaze" – 4:30
"Promise" – 3:54
"Propaganda (mix)" – 3:02
"Propaganda (1984 mix)" – 4:03
"Sin of Sins (1984 mix)" – 6:05
"Poison Takes a Hold" – 4:23
"Introduction" – 4:28
"T.V. Eye" – 4:03
"Final Epitaph" – 4:10

Personnel
Rob Hickson - vocals
Pete Waddleton - bass
Steve Green (play dead) - guitar
Re-Vox - Tracks 13,14,15, and 16 guitar
Mark "Wiff" Smith - drums
Roy Rowland - producer

References

Play Dead (band) albums
1983 debut albums